Donovan Brown is a Canadian actor.

Career

Early work 
Donovan got his start in television with a recurring role on the TeenNick series Open Heart.

Filmography

References

External links 

Living people
Canadian male film actors
Canadian male television actors
Black Canadian male actors
Canadian male child actors
Male actors from Toronto
21st-century Canadian male actors
Canadian people of African-American descent
1999 births